The Argyle Line is a suburban railway located in West Central Scotland. The line serves the commercial and shopping districts of Glasgow's central area, and connects towns from West Dunbartonshire to South Lanarkshire. Named for Glasgow's Argyle Street, the line uses the earlier cut-and-cover tunnel running beneath that thoroughfare.

The term "Argyle Line" is commonly used to describe:
 the extensive urban passenger train service that connects the towns and suburbs of North Clyde with Motherwell, Larkhall, and Lanark, to the southeast. Of the 48 stations, 4 are in West Dunbartonshire, 4 in East Dunbartonshire, 17 in Glasgow City, 10 in North Lanarkshire, and 13 in South Lanarkshire.

History

Prior to 1964
The line closed in 1964 as a result of the Beeching Axe.

Overview 1979 opening
On 1 November 1979, the Queen officially opened the Argyle Line, with services commencing four days later. This joint venture between British Rail and the Strathclyde Passenger Transport Executive (SPTE) comprised a tunnel diversion and reopening the  Stobcross–Rutherglen low-level line. However, the Argyle name later applied to the combined – routes.

Infrastructure
The new connection with the original North British Railway route via  and a rebuilt  also incorporated a grade-separated junction with the Queen Street Low Level route. The already electrified North Clyde Line northwest of Partick and West Coast Main Line (WCML) southeast of Rutherglen were linked by laying double tracks and installing overhead electrical wiring along the disused section that had separated these networks. At Rutherglen, a new platform was built and the main line ones abandoned.

Finnieston West Junction– is sub-surface:
 Brickwork was power washed and repaired.
 Concrete slabs superseded ballast.
The frontage of Glasgow Green station was demolished in March 2012, and the entrance to Glasgow Cross station (adjacent to the Tollbooth) has been turned into ventilation ducts, visible from the traffic island between Trongate and London Road.
  (called Finnieston until 1986) was rebuilt. Slightly to the west of the original GCR Stobcross station, the only commonality between the two is the location of much of the eastbound platform (which was originally the westbound one). A new siding enabled westbound trains to stable and turn back.
 Tunnel lengths are Kelvinhaugh (Finnieston West Junction–Exhibition Centre) , Stobcross (Exhibition Centre–Anderston) , Anderston (Anderston–Glasgow Green) , Canning St (Glasgow Green–Bridgeton) , and Dalmarnock Rd (Bridgeton–Dalmarnock) .

Flooding
Dalmarnock has been flooded several times.

Extensions
The Larkhall Line was opened as an extension to Argyle Line services in December 2005 by First Minister Jack McConnell. The branch is single line throughout, with a crossing loop at Allanton. , formerly a North Clyde service, became a destination.

The Whifflet Line service that reopened in October 1993 received electrification of the Rutherglen–Whifflet section in December 2014. This enabled a rerouting through Glasgow Central Low Level to the western suburbs, increased frequency on the route, reduced WCML usage conflict, and created a diversionary path for long distance WCML services. At the same time, Lanark services switched to Glasgow Central High Level.

Service patterns

Services

Routes
At Dalmuir Park Junction, southeastwards enters the Yoker line, before rejoining at Hyndland East Junction, and eastwards remains on the North Clyde (officially North Electric Main Line) via Singer and Westerton Junction, where the  Milngavie Branch joins. This route continues via Knightswood North and South junctions, and Hyndland.

Eastbound trains enter the Kelvinhaugh Tunnel immediately to the west of Sandyford Street. The mouth of the Stobcross Depot Tunnel can be seen from the eastbound platform of Exhibition Centre.

Westbound trains ascend to join the North Clyde line from Queen Street station. This steep incline originally gave access to the sidings at Queen's Dock from the Stobcross Railway.

The WCML is accessed after Rutherglen. At Newton Junction, eastwards follows the WCML via , and southeastwards is the Hamilton Circle. The Hamilton Circle terminates at Motherwell.

Bellshill is  after leaving the WCML at Uddingston Junction. Beyond the station, the route joins the line south from Whifflet, returning to the WCML at Motherwell. Southeast  at Lanark Junction, the  single-track branch serves Lanark, the southeastern extremity.

Frequency

Rolling stock
At its opening, the rolling stock on the Argyle Line was Class 314 electric multiple units, which were then new. These were accompanied by a number of the older Class 303 "Blue Train" sets from the North Clyde route. In the late 1980s and early 1990s, Class 311 trains also operated on this route. After the 303s were retired in 2002, the route was operated by a mixture of new Class 334 Alstom "Juniper" units, alongside a small number of 1980s vintage Class 318 trains cascaded from the Ayrshire routes, with the original Class 314 sets transferred to the Cathcart Circle. Following the opening of the Airdrie-Bathgate rail link, most Class 334 units were transferred to services on this route. The Class 320s were subsequently fitted with yaw dampers, allowing for 90mph running up from their previous 75mph limit, which enabled them to replace the Class 334s on the Argyle Line

The Argyle Line is operated by Class 320s and Class 318s with the occasional Class 334 appearing and Class 385s covering Lanark services that now run into Glasgow Central. Class 380s used to operate the line from 2014 to 2019 covering Lanark services when they first ran into Central High Level.

Footnotes

References

Transport in Glasgow
Railway lines in Scotland
Railway lines opened in 1979
Railway lines opened in 2005
Standard gauge railways in Scotland